Terrorism in Burkina Faso refers to non-state actor violence in Burkina Faso carried out with the intent of causing fear and spreading extremist ideology. Terrorist activity primarily involves religious terrorism conducted by foreign-based organizations, although some activity occurs because of communal frustration over the lack of economic development. Recent attacks have concentrated in the Hauts-Bassins, Boucle du Mouhoun, Nord, Sahel, and Est regions, along the border with Mali and Niger. A series of attacks in Ouagadougou in 2016, 2017, and 2018 by al-Qaeda in the Islamic Maghreb and its affiliates garnered international attention.

Counter-terrorism efforts by Burkina Faso include domestic and regional security efforts, preventing terrorism-related economic transactions, and cooperating with the West, often through partnerships like the G5 Sahel and Trans-Sahara Counterterrorism Partnership. Security force violence and alleged human rights abuses have regularly undermined these efforts. In response to the growing attacks, the government declared a state of emergency in December 2018 in several northern provinces. The failure of the government to stem terrorist attacks led to the 2019 resignation of former Prime Minister Paul Thieba. Overall, terrorism has had a significant impact in Burkina Faso, displacing more than 100,000 people and diminishing access to public services.

Background

Independence to 2015 
Prior to 2015, there were no recorded terrorist incidents in Burkina Faso. However, the country experienced seven coups during this time period, the most of any African country. Additionally, there were some reports that terrorist financing and fund-raising were taking place domestically.

Some argue that then-President Blaise Compaoré, who was in power from 1987 to 2014, partnered with terrorist organizations. While most research suggests that partnerships between Compoaré and terrorist organizations did exist, the exact nature of these agreements remains unverified. In particular, some reports show that Compaoré brokered an agreement with Tuareg rebel groups in Mali associated with al-Qaeda. In trade for operating in Burkina Faso, the Tuareg groups and associated terrorist organizations allegedly agreed not to carry out attacks within the country.

In addition, Compaoré allowed special forces from France and the U.S. to operate in Burkina Faso, serving as a key partner for counterterrorism efforts in the Sahel. Such partnerships led to descriptions of Burkina Faso as "West Africa's linchpin" by the media. Linchpin states signify "crucial but endangered allies" in "creating a global anti-terror regime."

2015 military coup to 2018 
During this time period, attacks in Burkina Faso increased both in number and fatality rate. Such incidents garnered international attention, especially including three major terrorist attacks in Ouagadougou in 2016, 2017, and 2018.

According to Joe Penney, this spike in activity can perhaps be attributed to the current government's discontinuation of Compaoré's practice of negotiating with terrorist organizations. Another more referenced cause is the weakened Burkina Faso security apparatus.

In 2014, popular uprisings removed Compaoré from power. Following his removal, the Burkina Faso Regiment of Presidential Security (French: Régiment de la Sécurité Présidentielle, RSP), who was loyal to Compoaré, carried out a coup in 2015 against the transitional government. Although the coup failed, the RSP was dissolved, weakening the state security apparatus and allowing terrorist organizations to increase their operations domestically. The RSP included about 1,300 soldiers and had received training from the U.S. and France in counterterrorism practices. Following its dissolution, this technical expertise and manpower was no longer available to contribute to security efforts. For comparison, Burkina Faso's entire Armed Forces currently has approximately 11,200 personnel − the RSP thus constituted about 10% of Burkina Faso's army.

More recently, human rights organizations have also accused the security forces of carrying out "atrocities...leaving scores dead and forcing tens of thousands of villagers to flee their homes." Some argue that the human rights abuses conducted by the security forces in the name of counterterrorism undermines their effectiveness at preventing terrorist attacks, because abuses make locals less likely to collaborate with security forces against terrorist organizations.

In response to the increased terrorist threat, in November 2016, Burkina Faso decided to withdraw its soldiers from United Nations peacekeeping in Sudan to refocus military efforts on fighting terrorism domestically and to help reinforce existing security forces.

2018 state of emergency to present 
Beginning in December 2018, there was a spike in terrorist activity in Burkina Faso. Over a two-month period, there were eight terror attacks, killing over thirty people altogether (see List of terrorist incidents below).

In response to a terror attack near the border with Mali on December 27, 2018 that killed ten gendarmes, the Burkina Faso government declared a state of emergency in several northern provinces. The state of emergency began on January 1, 2019 and included the following fourteen provinces.

 Boucle du Mouhoun: Kossi, Sourou
 Centre-Est: Koulpélogo
 Est: Gnagna, Gourma, Komandjari, Kompienga, Tapoa
 Hauts-Bassins: Kénédougou
 Nord: Lorum
 Sahel: Oudalan, Séno, Soum, Yagha

As part of the declaration, the government authorized curfews, restrictions on movement, searches of private property, weapons confiscation, and prohibiting pro-terrorism publications. The government ruled that any terrorist crimes would be tried in military, not civilian, courts.

Even with these amended regulations, several terrorist attacks occurred during January 2019. In response, on January 19, former Prime Minister Paul Thieba resigned from office. For months leading up to his resignation, the opposition had called for Thieba to step down due to the failure of the government to stop terrorist attacks. Although Thieba did not provide the reason for his resignation, President Roch Marc Christian Kaboré likely pressured Thieba to resign due to the high-profile terrorism-related kidnapping of foreigners in Burkina Faso in December.

Terrorist organizations 
Several different terrorist organizations have claimed responsibility for attacks in Burkina Faso. Most attacks are carried out by foreign-based organizations, affiliated with Al-Qaeda, usually from neighboring Mali. Such organizations tend to focus on religious extremism and anti-Western sentiment. However, some organizations also target Burkina Faso because of communal frustration over the lack of economic development. In particular, terrorist organizations are able to recruit people in Burkina Faso, due to disillusionment about the stagnating economy.

Al-Qaeda in the Islamic Maghreb and its affiliates 
Prior to 2017, most attacks were carried out by al-Qaeda in the Islamic Maghreb (AQIM). AQIM is the North African branch of al-Qaeda (AQ), based in Mali. AQIM has conducted attacks all over the Sahel. For example, AQIM and its affiliate, al-Mourabitoun, claimed responsibility for the 2016 Ouagadougou attacks. These two organizations had merged one month earlier in December 2015, although they previously had a contentious relationship. Following the merger, many expected the danger posed by AQIM to the region to increase.

In March 2017, Jama'at Nusrat al-Islam wal Muslimeen (JNIM) formed from the merger of AQIM, Ansar al-Dine, and al-Mourabitoun.  JNIM remains under the control of AQIM/AQ and is based in Mali. Since its formation, JNIM has carried out several attacks in Burkina Faso. For example, JNIM claimed responsibility for the 2018 Ouagadougou attacks.  JNIM's creation was particularly interesting because it signaled AQ's adaptability. AQ perhaps expected JNIM to counter the growing presence of the Islamic State in the Sahel. JNIM poses a particularly serious threat because it has a wide set of capabilities including high fatality rates, targeting foreigners (from Western nations), striking armed targets, and coordinating several attacks at once.

Other AQ affiliates that have participated in terrorist activity in Burkina Faso include: Ansar-ul-Islam lil-Ichad wal Jihad (IRSAD), which is led by a radicalized Burkina Faso preacher, Islamic State in the Greater Sahara (ISGS), a breakaway group from al-Mourabitoun that pledged allegiance to the Islamic State in Iraq and the Levant (ISIL/IS), Macina Liberation Front, a Mali organization that has worked with AQIM, and the Movement for Unity and Jihad in West Africa (MUJAO), a breakaway group from AQIM.

Islamic State and its affiliates 
ISIL activity in Burkina Faso has been limited as compared to AQIM activity.

Its main affiliate near Burkina Faso, Islamic State in the Greater Sahara (ISGS) formed in May 2015 from a breakaway faction of al-Mourabitoun that pledged allegiance to IS. ISGS has conducted at least two attacks in Burkina Faso. On September 1, 2016, ISGS attacked a gendarmerie and, on October 12, 2016, it attacked a police outpost. Both incidents occurred in the Sahel region of Burkina Faso.

Another affiliate of the Islamic State, Boko Haram is also believed to operate in Burkina Faso. Boko Haram is a terrorist organization based in nearby Nigeria. Some suspect this organization of smuggling weapons and money through Burkina Faso.  Additionally, a witness to a terrorist attack on August 23, 2015 in the Oursi province of Burkina Faso claimed that the terrorists had expressed allegiance to Boko Haram.

List of major terrorist incidents

Terrorist incidents are currently concentrated in the Sahel and Est regions because these regions are particularly close to instability in Mali and Niger. The most fatal attacks include the 2016, 2017, and 2018 terror attacks in Ouagadougou. As shown in the table below, there has been a further spike in terrorism activity in 2019.

* Most "unidentified" terror attacks are likely carried out by Ansar al-Islam or Jamaat Nusrat al-Islam wal Muslimeen.

** Jamaat Nusrat al-Islam wal Muslimeen (JNIM) formed in March 2017 from the merger of al-Qaeda in the Islamic Maghreb, Ansar al-Dine, and al-Mourabitoun.

Counterterrorism efforts 
Counterterrorism efforts in Burkina Faso are two-fold. First, domestic efforts involve mobilizing the military to prevent terrorist attacks. Second, international efforts involve improving security, preventing terrorist economic activities, and partnerships with Western countries.

Domestic efforts 
Burkina Faso's President Roch Marc Christian Kaboré has described counterterrorism as a "national priority." Efforts to fight terrorism include placing more security forces throughout Burkina Faso, creating specialized task forces, and organizing raids targeting terrorists.

Regarding increasing security forces in Burkina Faso, President Kaboré planned to remove soldiers deployed as peacekeepers in Darfur, Sudan by July 2017 to refocus manpower on domestic terrorism issues. The government also requested in 2016 that Burkina Faso soldiers that were part of the United Nations (UN) peacekeeping mission in Mali be deployed to areas close to its own border. Nonetheless, media reports in 2019 showed that Burkina Faso forces outside the country were often better trained than domestic units.

The government also created specialized military units dedicated to fighting terrorism. In January 2013, the Groupement des Forces Anti-Terroristes (GFAT) was created as a joint Army-Gendarmerie-Police counterterrorism task force. GFAT has since grown from 500 troops to 1,600 troops that specialize in targeting terrorism activity.

From 2018 onward, the military has also been conducting more raids against terrorist networks in northern areas of Burkina Faso, but such raids are often correlated with alleged human rights abuses. For example, on February 4, 2019, the Army claimed to have fought and killed 146 terrorists near the border with Mali, but human rights groups suggested that there was no evidence that the people targeted were terrorists and described the incident as a "summary execution."

Such human rights abuses dampen counterterrorism efforts because they make locals less likely to collaborate with security forces against terrorist organizations. Worries over security force violence might also contribute to the ambiguous or favorable attitudes that about 30% of Burkina Faso people have towards terrorist groups like the Islamic State. Although Burkina Faso puts significant effort into counterterrorism efforts, some of these efforts might thus be hindered by security force violence.

On 9 April 2020, security forces of Burkina Faso executed 31 unarmed men on the day of their arrest by the security forces. They were killed within a few hours of their arrest.

International efforts 
International counterterrorism efforts in Burkina Faso involve regional cooperation to improve physical and economic security, as well as partnerships with Western countries.

Security efforts 

Burkina Faso partners with other countries in the region to improve security efforts. The country is part of the G5 Sahel, a cooperative alliance between Burkina Faso, Chad, Mali, Mauritania, and Niger. The G5 Sahel focuses on six key issue areas, one of which is domestic security, and operates a Joint Force.

The Joint Force primarily prevents terrorism by deploying border patrols to limit criminal movement. The Force is backed by the international community − it was authorized by the African Union, upheld by a United Nations Security Council resolution, and supported by French military forces and a $60 million grant from the United States. This international financial support is particularly useful because funding is "perhaps the most immediate challenge" of the task force.

Economic efforts 
Burkina Faso also partners with regional organizations to prevent terrorism-related economic activities. In particular, it is part of the Inter-Governmental Action Group Against Money Laundering in West Africa (GIABA). GIABA is a Financial Action Task Force authorized by the Economic Community of West African States (ECOWAS), a regional cooperative organization in which Burkina Faso plays an active role.

Part of GIABA's mission in Burkina Faso is to prevent terrorist financing. In response, Burkina Faso has taken measures to close economic regulatory gaps and to hold discussions with the public to better understand how terrorism and other illicit activities benefit off the economy.

While GIABA is making headway in Burkina Faso, there were no convictions as of 2012 for terrorist financing in the country.

Partnerships with the West 
In addition to regional efforts, Burkina Faso is also part of several U.S. Department of State-led programs, including the Trans-Sahara Counterterrorism Partnership (TSCTP). The TSCTP provides support for regional cooperation, educational programs to prevent radicalization, democracy promotion, and military training.

Burkina Faso also participates in the State Department's Africa Peacekeeping Program (AFRICAP) II, Africa Contingency Operations Training and Assistance (ACOTA) contracts, and National Defense Authorization Act (NDAA) Section 2282 funding initiatives.

Other prominent allies with regards to counterterrorism efforts include France and Denmark.

Impacts of terrorism 
Terrorism has had several significant impacts on Burkina Faso, including the displacement of people, limiting access to public services, and declining safety ratings.

Displacement 
According to a March 2019 United Nations High Commissioner for Refugees (UNHCR) report, increasing violence has led to the displacement of 115,310 Internally Displaced Persons (IDPs) in Burkina Faso. Regions most affected included the Sahel, Centre-Nord, Nord, and Est regions, which are also where terrorism attacks are the highest.

In January 2019, the Burkina Faso government created two IDP-hosting sites and a response strategy to the displacement crisis. Currently, 90% of IDPs live in host communities, many of whom live in the Mentao refugee camp near Djibo, Sahel. IDPs face several issues including malaria, cholera, and respiratory disease outbreaks, sexual violence, and cultural clashes.

Some of these issues have been addressed by international organizations. For example, Médecins du Monde, a French organization, recently installed four health clinics in the Mentao camp. Meanwhile, the UNHCR deployed a Field Unit to the Mentao camp and provided 93 refugee housing units to IDPs throughout the Sahel and Centre-Nord regions.

Access to public services 
Terrorism has harmed access to education and health facilities in several areas of the country. According to a report by the BBC, since December 2018, 1,111 out of 2,869 schools in the Nord, Sahel, and Est regions of Burkina Faso have closed. Due to terrorist activity, 150,000 children were effected, only 57.9% of children in 2016 completed elementary school, and 352 schools were closed in the Soum province, the highest rate in the country.

Meanwhile, access to health services in Burkina Faso has also declined. Prior to 2015, the health system was able to overcome external pressure and maintain secure access to health services. However, the increase in terrorism has made it harder for the system to address citizen needs. A study found that while health services had "appropriate management" in response to terrorist attacks, it still faced several issues, including coordinating resource allocation in crises. In addition, security measures by the government have caused some health workers to be unwilling to work in dangerous areas, undermining access to health services in regions affected by terrorism. Meanwhile, IDPs also face poor health access. For example, the local health center at the Mentao refugee camp (which houses 30% of all IDPs) provides free health services but is constantly overwhelmed with patients.

Safety ratings 
As expected, following the flare in terrorist activity in 2015, safety ratings of Burkina Faso have declined. The U.S. State Department's Overseas Security Advisory Council regularly publishes reports on crime and safety in Burkina Faso. In 2015, the country had a terrorism rating of low. In 2016, the terrorism rating increased to medium. And, in 2018, the terrorism threat was listed as high, with regards to activity "directed at or affecting official U.S. government interests."  Additionally, the U.S. State Department also raised Burkina Faso to Level 3 on its travel advisory scale in 2019 which signifies that people should "reconsider travel to Burkina Faso due to terrorism and kidnapping." Meanwhile, particular areas of Burkina Faso were at Level 4 or "Do not travel;" these areas included the Sahel, Est, and Centre-Est regions, the western border areas with Mali, and certain neighborhoods in the capital of Ouagadougou.

Ratings from other countries also follow this pattern. The UK Foreign and Commonwealth Office advised in 2019 against "all but essential travel" to any area of Burkina Faso, listing the country as one of the most dangerous in the world. The Canadian Government issued a similar warning to "avoid non-essential travel...due to the threat of terrorism."

References